Brad Johner (born February 4, 1966) is a Canadian country music singer.

Biography
Brad Johner grew up in Saskatchewan playing music in his family band. When he was 16, Brad won a National Talent Contest during Country Music Week in Hamilton in 1982. He spent six years maintaining his solo career before teaming up with his brother Ken to form The Johner Brothers in 1988. After 14 years, six albums (including their Greatest Hits), 26 singles, one Canadian Country Music Association (CCMA) award and more than 40 awards from the Saskatchewan Country Music Association (SCMA), including Entertainer of the Decade, Ken decided to retire from the music business to pursue other interests in 2002.

After the Johner Brothers dissolved, Brad returned to his solo career. He moved to Saskatoon with his wife Rhea and their five sons to begin work on his first solo album with producer Bart McKay. The album, Free, was released by Royalty Records in 2003. The album was nominated for Album of the Year by the CCMA and the Juno Awards, and won Outstanding Country Album at the 2003 Western Country Music Awards. In 2004, the Canadian Independent Music Awards named Johner Favourite Country Artist/Group of the Year. Brad won Male Vocalist of the Year at the 2003 SCMA, along with Single and Song of the Year for "Hello." He cleaned up the following year at the SCMA ceremonies, winning Entertainer and Male Vocalist of the Year. "Free" was named Song, Single and Video of the Year, and Free won Album of the Year. His backup band, the Brad Johner Band, won Backup Band of the Year.

An American record label (Infinity Records Nashville) took notice of Brad, and re-released his debut album in the United States in 2004. The label folded before "Free," the first single, took off at radio. Brad signed with Canadian label 306 Records for the release of his second album, Summertown Road, in 2005. The first four singles from the album reached the Canadian country top 25, including "She Moved," "I'd Rather Be Lucky," "Your Love Is My Luck," and the top 10 "I've Got It Good." At the 2005 SCMA Award ceremony in March, Brad won 10 awards, including Fans' Choice Entertainer of the Year, Male Vocalist of the Year and the National Achievement Award. On July 17, 2005, Brad received a star on the Merritt Walk of Stars. Brad released his first solo Christmas album, Now That's Christmas in November 2005.

Summertown Road was nominated for Album of the Year by the CCMA in 2006, and Brad picked up a nod for Male Vocalist of the Year. Once again, Brad was named Fans' Choice Entertainer and Male Vocalist of the Year at the 2006 SCMA Awards on March 19, 2006. One month later, he was presented the Saskatchewan Centennial Medal in recognition of his outstanding musical achievements and contributions to the province. At the CMA Music Festival in 2006, Brad was chosen to represent Canada at the Global Artist Party. When the 2007 SCMA Awards were handed out on April 15, Brad was named Entertainer of the Year for the fourth year in a row, and Male Vocalist for the sixth straight year. Brad was also named Male Vocalist of the Year at the 2007 CCMA Awards.

Charity work
Johner has made appearances on Telemiracle, a yearly telethon.  Johner co-wrote the current Telemiracle opening theme song with Donny Parenteau entitled "You are the Miracle". It became the theme in 2011.

Discography

Studio albums

Christmas albums

Singles

Music videos

Awards and nominations
Johner has been nominated for many awards for his body of work.  Between his solo work and the Johner Brothers, Brad he has won 67 Saskatchewan Country Music Awards which makes him one of the all-time winningest nominees in award history.

See also
The Johner Brothers

References

External links
Brad Johner Official Site

1966 births
Living people
306 Records artists
Musicians from Saskatchewan
Canadian country guitarists
Canadian male guitarists
Canadian country singer-songwriters
Canadian Country Music Association Male Artist of the Year winners
20th-century Canadian male singers
21st-century Canadian guitarists
20th-century Canadian guitarists
Canadian male singer-songwriters
21st-century Canadian male singers